Sabrina Diana Colie is an actor and film and theatre director. She was born in Mandeville, Jamaica and resides in New York City.

Education
Colie completed her elementary education at Mt. St. Joseph Preparatory and high school and sixth form at Manchester High, Mandeville where she was valedictorian. She attended the School of Drama at Edna Manley College of the Visual and Performing Arts before matriculating to Colgate University, from which she graduated in 2005 with a Bachelor of Arts double major in Theater and French, followed by a Master of Fine Arts in Film from the CUNY City College.

Career
Colie was a supporting actress in Jamaica's longest running film, Destiny (2014). She has acted in numerous Off Off broadway plays and produced and directed short films.

Early life
Colie and her sole and younger sibling, were born to a teacher and dramatist of African and Scottish ancestry and a mechanical engineer of Indian ancestry.

References

External links
 
 https://www.jamaicanmovies.com/destiny
 http://www.fandango.com/destiny_183816/movieoverview

Jamaican actresses
Colgate University alumni
Living people
Jamaican people of Scottish descent
Year of birth missing (living people)